Kicking in Austria may refer to:

 the catastral district of Peilstein im Mühlviertel in Upper Austria or
 the catastral district of Dunkelsteinerwald in Lower Austria